Milton of Buchanan is a small village in Stirling, Scotland,  within the parish of Buchanan. Historically, the village was in the Registration County of Stirlingshire. It was the main village of the parish of Buchanan. However, the village is now a quiet collection of houses along with a school, village hall, and church.

Facilities
The village has a village hall and a parish church with a small graveyard. Buchanan Primary School is situated in the village and the local high school is Balfron High School in the nearby village of Balfron.

There are no shops in the village. However, people can go to the nearby villages of Balmaha or Drymen to buy things.

See also
 Balmaha
 Buchanan Smithy

References

External links

 Loch Lomond and the Trossachs National Park - Buchanan
 Location of Milton of Buchanan

Villages in Stirling (council area)